Kirakosyan or in Western Armenian pronunciation Giragosian and francicized Guiragossian is an Armenian surname derived from the given name Kirakos. It may refer to:

Kirakosyan
Barsegh Kirakosyan (born 1982), Armenian football defender
John Kirakosyan (1929–1985), Armenians historian and political scientist
Levan Kirakosyan (born 1973), Armenian boxer
Vrezh Kirakosyan (born in 1983), Armenian singer

Kirakossian
Arman Kirakossian (1956–2019), Armenian diplomat and historian

Giragosian
Richard Giragosian, Armenian American academic and political scientist

Guiragossian
Paul Guiragossian (1926–1993), Lebanese Armenian painter

See also
Kirakos / Giragos, disambiguation 

Armenian-language surnames